Trapper John, M.D. is an American medical drama television series and spin-off of the film M*A*S*H (1970). Pernell Roberts portrayed the title character, a lovable surgeon who became a mentor and father figure in San Francisco, California. The show ran on CBS for seven seasons, from September 23, 1979, to September 4, 1986. Roberts played the character more than twice as long as had Wayne Rogers (1972–75) on the TV series M*A*S*H. The role of Trapper John was played by Elliott Gould in the film.

Overview
Trapper John, M.D. focuses on Dr. "Trapper" John McIntyre (Pernell Roberts) 28 years after his discharge from the 4077th Mobile Army Surgical Hospital (MASH) in the Korean War. During that time after the war, the character had mellowed considerably. He did not merely learn how to stop fighting the system but became a part of it, in a sense, as the Chief of Surgery at San Francisco Memorial Hospital. Trapper shows tremendous compassion toward his patients, often violating "established hospital procedures".

Seasons 1–6
Working with Trapper is an aspiring young professional named Dr. George Alonzo Gates (Gregory Harrison), usually referred to as Gonzo, who has a lot in common with Trapper, having also served in a MASH unit (albeit during the later Vietnam War). His sense of humor and love of life also reflect elements of Trapper's younger days. Gonzo resides in his motor home (dubbed "The Titanic") in the hospital parking lot.

The show also involves several other characters that serve as hospital staff.

Stanley Riverside II (Charles Siebert) is a pompous, status-seeking, but nonetheless capable doctor whose father is the head of the hospital board of directors.  He later marries a dentist named E.J. (Marcia Rodd)
Justin "Jackpot" Jackson (Brian Stokes Mitchell) is a young doctor always interested in wagers.
Gloria "Ripples" Brancusi (Christopher Norris) is a young nurse who later adopts a sickly, homeless girl, Andrea. Her nickname Ripples was dropped after the first few episodes.
Clara "Starch" Willoughby (Mary McCarty) is an experienced nurse who had served in the Korean War with Trapper. McCarty died after the first season. In the show's continuity, at the beginning of season 2 her character is said to have gotten married, retired, and moved away.
Ernestine Shoop (Madge Sinclair) replaces Starch as the experienced older nurse from season 2 onwards. Sinclair picked up three Emmy nominations for her work as the dedicated and dignified Nurse Shoop.
Arnold Slocum (Simon Scott) is the hospital administrator who often clashes with Trapper and Gonzo, though there is strong mutual respect between all parties. Slocum—though charged with operating within regulations and keeping to a budget—clearly has sympathy and compassion for the patients. Scott suffered from Alzheimer's and made his final appearance in season six before retiring from acting.
In season six, Trapper's son, J.T. McIntyre (Timothy Busfield), graduates from medical school and arrives at the hospital to work on his internship. He stays for the remainder of the run of the show.

Season 7
The show underwent a number of changes during Trapper John'''s seventh and final season.

Christopher Norris left the series at the end of season six. Her character Gloria is replaced by new nurse Libby Kegler (Lorna Luft) at the start of season seven.
Simon Scott, suffering from Alzheimer's disease, had made his final appearance partway through season six. At the beginning of season seven, his character of hospital administrator Arnold Slocum is said to have retired. Slocum is replaced by administrator Catherine Hackett (Janis Paige).
Added as a recurring player beginning with the season's third episode is ER service helicopter pilot and surgeon, Dr. Andy Pagano (Beau Gravitte).
Mid-way through the season, Gregory Harrison elected to leave the show. The character of Gonzo is written out, as he retires from medicine after having suffered a stroke. Gonzo is replaced by Dr. Jacob Christmas (Kip Gilman), a doctor who loses his wife in an accident, and is forced to become a single parent to his young son while adjusting to his new work environment.

Only nine further irregularly-scheduled episodes of Trapper John were produced after Harrison's departure.

After Harrison's last episode, the show was off the air for three weeks, then brought back on a different night before being pre-empted three times in the next four weeks. A top 30 hit for most of its run, Trapper John, M.D. fell out of the top 30 during season seven, and was canceled by season's end.

The final four episodes were aired late in the summer of 1986, well after the show's cancellation had already been announced.

Cast
Main cast

 Pernell Roberts as Dr. "Trapper" John McIntyre, M.D.
 Gregory Harrison as Dr. George Alonzo "Gonzo" Gates, M.D.
 Charles Siebert as Dr. Stanley Riverside II, M.D.
 Brian Stokes Mitchell as Dr. Justin "Jackpot" Jackson, M.D.
 Christopher Norris as Nurse Gloria "Ripples" Brancusi (1979–1985)
 Mary McCarty as Nurse Clara "Starch" Willoughby (1979–1980)
 Simon Scott  as Arnold Slocum, Hosp. Administrator (1979–1985)
 Madge Sinclair as Nurse Ernestine Shoop (1980–1986)
 Timothy Busfield as Dr. John "J.T." McIntyre, Jr., M.D. (1984–1986)
 Lorna Luft as Nurse Libby Kegler (1985–1986)
 Janis Paige as Catherine Hackett, the new administrator (1985–1986)
 Kip Gilman as Dr. Jacob Christmas (1986)

Recurring cast
Jessica Walter as Melanie McIntyre, Trapper's ex-wife. (10 episodes, seasons 1–2, 4–7)
Richard Schaal as Dr. David Sandler, who becomes Melanie's fiancé.  (8 episodes, seasons 2–4, 6–7)
Beau Gravitte as Dr. Andy Pagano, ER service helicopter pilot and surgeon.  (10 episodes, season 7).

Cast notes
Character actress Lurene Tuttle guest-starred six times in different roles.

Episodes

Development
In a suit filed in New York state court, Ingo Preminger, producer of the 1970 motion picture M*A*S*H, claimed that under his deal with 20th Century Fox, his production company had both the right of first refusal to produce any spin-off of the movie, and the right to fees from the use of the book and film's material. New York State Supreme Court Justice Martin Stecher found that Preminger's agreement with Fox did not give him the right to produce Trapper John M.D., but did entitle him to a 25% share in profits from the show. This decision was later cited by the same court in its 2008 decision in Kellman v. Mosley, involving a claim for royalties involving the Easy Rawlins detective series.

It has sometimes been reported that the producers of the television series M*A*S*H filed suit claiming they were entitled to royalties from the new show, arguing that it was based on the character as portrayed in their series by Wayne Rogers, but the producers of Trapper John, M.D successfully argued that it was based only on the earlier film and Richard Hooker's MASH: A Novel About Three Army Doctors. In fact, these reports appear to be a confused description of Preminger v. Twentieth Century Fox Film Corp. Both TV series were produced under deals with 20th Century Fox Television, and the film was produced by parent company 20th Century Fox.

The pilot includes photos and video clips (part of a dream) taken from the M*A*S*H'' film and TV series, including a publicity photo of Trapper (as portrayed by Wayne Rogers) and Hawkeye (Alan Alda), and the character mentions Radar and Hawkeye by name. However, none of the other M*A*S*H characters appeared as characters, and references to Trapper's time in Korea were rare.

References

External links
 

1970s American drama television series
1970s American medical television series
1979 American television series debuts
1980s American drama television series
1980s American medical television series
1986 American television series endings
CBS original programming
English-language television shows
Fictional military medical personnel
M*A*S*H
Television series by 20th Century Fox Television
Television shows set in San Francisco
Works set in hospitals